Mark Todd Bradshaw (born 11 May 1973) is an Australian cricketer. He played one List A match for South Australia in 1998/99.

References

External links
 

1973 births
Living people
Australian cricketers
South Australia cricketers
Cricketers from Adelaide